Following is the list of the 48 episodes and eight OVAs (Original video animations) of the Japanese shōnen romantic comedy manga and anime series Kimagure Orange Road.

TV Episode List

OVA list

OVA 1
Theme songs:
Opening: 
Vocals: Meiko Nakahara 
Lyrics: Meiko Nakahara
Composer: Meiko Nakahara
Arrangement: Akira Nishihara
Ending: "Dance in the Memories"
Vocals: Meiko Nakahara
Lyrics: Meiko Nakahara
Composer: Meiko Nakahara
Arrangement: Akira Nishihara

OVA 2
Theme songs:
Opening: 
Vocals: Yuiko Tsubakura 
Lyrics: Show
Composer: Kazuya Izumi
Arrangement: Shirō Sagisu
Ending: 
Vocals: Yuka Tachibana
Lyrics: Ryū Sawachi
Composer: Shirō Sagisu
Arrangement: Shirō Sagisu
Insert:  (only in "Stage of Love" episodes)
Vocals: Yuiko Tsubakura
Lyrics: Show
Composer: Shirō Sagisu
Arrangement: Shirō Sagisu

OVA 3
Theme songs:
Opening: 
Vocals: Yuiko Tsubakura 
Lyrics: Show
Composer: Kazuya Izumi
Arrangement: Shirō Sagisu
Ending: 
Vocals: Kanako Wada
Lyrics: Reiko Yukawa
Composer: Yūichirō Oda
Arrangement: Jun Irie

See also
Kimagure Orange Road
List of Kimagure Orange Road soundtracks

References

External links
 Official Kimagure Orange Road TV Series

Kimagure Orange Road
Kimagure Orange Road